"Clint Eastwood" is a song by English virtual band Gorillaz, released as the first single from their self-titled debut album on 5 March 2001. The song is named after the actor of the same name due to its similarity to the theme music of The Good, the Bad and the Ugly. The song is a mix of electronic music, dub, hip hop and rock. The verses are rapped by Del the Funky Homosapien, portrayed as a blue phantom in the video, while the chorus is sung by Damon Albarn (2-D in the video).

"Clint Eastwood" peaked at number four on the UK Singles Chart and number 57 on the US Billboard Hot 100. "Clint Eastwood" also reached number one in Italy, number two in Germany, and the top 10 in seven other countries. The single has sold 1,200,000 copies in the UK and has been certified double platinum by the British Phonographic Industry (BPI). Rolling Stone ranked it at number 38 on its 100 best songs of the 2000s. In October 2011, NME placed it at number 141 on its list "150 Best Tracks of the Past 15 Years". The magazine also ranked it at number 347 on their list of "The 500 Greatest Songs of All Time". In 2021, Double J ranked it as the 14th best debut single of all time.

Recording
Demo versions of "Clint Eastwood" were originally recorded by Damon Albarn on a four-track using a drum machine and guitar. A re-recording similar to these demos was recorded into Logic for use as a backing track. The strings featured in the song are from a string machine, the Solina String Ensemble. According to engineer, Jason Cox, "Damon gave us the OK to set fire to it on stage, but we said 'No, you can't set fire to that! It's a classic!'", and it ended up being used on the song as well as some other tracks on the album. The drums are provided by a drum machine and the main instrument used in the song is the melodica, which Albarn used to make the basic track as well. The song's instrumental beat originated from the first preset of the Suzuki Omnichord.

Rapper Del the Funky Homosapien was brought onto the track at the last minute. The rap verses had originally been recorded by British group Phi Life Cypher, but producer Dan the Automator asked Del to quickly record his own verses for the song during a recording session for Deltron 3030 which he was recording with Del at the same time. Del then wrote and recorded his verses in "30 minutes", utilizing the book How to Write a Hit Song gifted to him by his mother. Del later said that he was completely unaware of the song's release and its success until people he personally knew began telling him that it was being played all over the radio.

Of the song's title, Albarn explained during a Reddit Ask Me Anything: "We were recording in Jamaica and listening to a lot of dancehall music and we imagined a cool moniker to have would be Clint Eastwood. Also I'm a great fan of the actor and of Sergio Leone and Ennio Morricone".

Alternative versions

Studio versions
Some of the single releases featured an alternative version of the song which featured British hip hop group Phi Life Cypher, who also feature on the group's B-side "The Sounder". This was the original version.

Live versions
For some live performances of the song, alternative rappers are used. For the 2005 Demon Detour Live, a version of the song featuring De La Soul, who have also appeared on "Feel Good Inc." and "Superfast Jellyfish", and Bootie Brown, who has also appeared on "Dirty Harry", was written and recorded. This version was released on the CD single of "Dare". During the Escape to Plastic Beach Tour, a third version of the track, featuring British rapper Tinie Tempah, was written and performed. During July 2010, when Tempah was unable to make tour performances, a fourth version of the song, featuring Tempah's verses performed by British grime MC's Kano and Bashy, was devised. Snoop Dogg also performed a rap during the group's 2010 Glastonbury performance. During the group's Asian tour dates, a fifth version of the song, featuring all new verses from Lebanese-Syrian rapper Eslam Jawaad, was performed.

During Gorillaz co-creator Damon Albarn's 2014 solo tour for Everyday Robots, he performed the song live with Dan the Automator and Del the Funky Homosapien for the first time. Later in the tour, he played the song with new guest rappers like Vic Mensa, while also bringing back rappers who have previously performed the song with Gorillaz like Bashy and Snoop Dogg.

Since Gorillaz' return in 2017, other rappers have performed the track, such as Little Simz and Vince Staples, with others like Kano and Del returning at select shows.

Argentine rap star and freestyler Trueno performed the song alongside Gorillaz at Quilmes Rock in 2022. Later that same year, American rapper Freddie Gibbs made a guest appearance onstage with Gorillaz where he performed his verse from "Thuggin'" off his 2014 album Piñata.

Reception
Alex Needham of NME praised the Ed Case Remix, stating that it "hauls [the track] down the dancefloor of Twice As Nice, where all the disparate elements fall into place and the jarring culture clash suddenly makes perfect sense. A little shift in perspective and, suddenly, you've got a west London Basement Jaxx, embodying a more interesting – and accurate – vision of England than anything Blur (Albarn's other project) have dared to attempt."

In 2001, Hewlett and Albarn indicated that they had not received any feedback from Clint Eastwood himself over the song. Albarn expressed a desire to send the actor some of the band's merchandise as a mark of respect, and said, "I'm sure Clint Eastwood would like [the song]. He's an intelligent man."

Music video
The animated music video was directed by Jamie Hewlett and Pete Candeland. It starts with the Gorillaz logo in red against a black screen, and the following quote from the 1978 film Dawn of the Dead: "Every dead body that is not exterminated, gets up and kills. The people it kills, get up and kill" in Japanese then in English. This phrase was deemed offensive in some countries and a censored version was produced that omits this intro. The video and song name is a reference to the famous western starring actor Clint Eastwood, The Good, the Bad and the Ugly. An interpolation of the yell from the film's theme song, in particular that film's protagonist Tuco's leitmotif, can be heard at the beginning of the video, followed by sinister laughter from Murdoc. The notes that the melodica plays are also based on the yell.

The band is seen playing their music against a completely white backdrop. 2-D is seen wearing a T-Virus shirt most likely referencing Resident Evil. Russel's cap then begins to mysteriously rise on its own, and the ghost of Del appears to be emerging from under it. He begins to rap, leaving the other band members dumbfounded, and the backdrop slowly develops dark clouds in the sky, and enormous tombstones start to burst out of the ground, and the scene becomes that of a cemetery, as a shower of rain and thunderstorm begins. Shortly afterwards, zombie gorilla hands rise up from the ground. Murdoc is grabbed by the crotch and pulled to the ground, a reference to the Peter Jackson zombie film Braindead. Seconds later, the zombie gorillas themselves rise up. Murdoc immediately flees at the sight of them, with a number of them pursuing him. He then turns and glares at them out of frustration at his inability to escape, and the zombie apes engage in a bizarre dance routine before Murdoc is knocked back by a lightning bolt; this dance routine is similar to the choreography of Michael Jackson's music video "Thriller".

Noodle is then shown joyfully skipping along, almost as if she is completely unaware of her surroundings, and in her playful skipping, she delivers a hard kick to one of the zombie gorillas in the face. Immediately afterwards, Del is then sucked back into Russel's head as the gorillas all disintegrate, and the band members are left standing in the cemetery, now bright with sunlight. The video then concludes with a split screen showing each of the four band members and their names. The video has a running time of 4:32, which is significantly different from the album version, which runs for approximately 5:42, however, the album version features about 1:10 of the backing track playing with no vocals over the top. The BPM of the music video is also slightly slower than that of the album version, and the music video version has an ending after the last time "My future" is sung, whilst the album version fades out at the end.

The video for "Clint Eastwood" won an award at the Rushes Soho Short Film Festival Awards in 2001, defeating entries by Blur, Fatboy Slim, Radiohead and Robbie Williams.

Track listings

UK and Australian CD single
"Clint Eastwood" – 5:55
"Clint Eastwood" (Ed Case and Sweetie Irie Refix) – 3:41
"Dracula" – 4:41
"Clint Eastwood" (enhanced video) – 4:28

UK 12-inch vinyl
A1. "Clint Eastwood" – 5:55
B1. "Clint Eastwood" (Ed Case and Sweetie Irie Refix) (edit) – 3:41
B2. "Clint Eastwood" (Phi Life Cypher version) – 4:52

UK cassette single
"Clint Eastwood" – 5:41
"Clint Eastwood" (Ed Case and Sweetie Irie Refix edit) – 3:41
"Dracula" – 4:41

European CD single
"Clint Eastwood" – 5:54
"Dracula" – 4:41

US promo CD
"Clint Eastwood" (original mix edit) – 3:44
"Clint Eastwood" (Ed Case and Sweetie Irie Refix edit) – 3:42
"Clint Eastwood" (Phi Life Cypher version) – 4:57
"Clint Eastwood" (call out hook)

Charts

Weekly charts

Year-end charts

Decade-end charts

Certifications and sales

Release history

See also
List of number-one hits of 2001 (Italy)

References

2001 songs
2001 debut singles
Cultural depictions of Clint Eastwood
Del the Funky Homosapien songs
Rap rock songs
Dub songs
Alternative dance songs
EMI Records singles
Gorillaz songs
Number-one singles in Italy
Parlophone singles
Songs written by Damon Albarn
Songs written by Jamie Hewlett
Virgin Records singles